The Theotokos of Tikhvin is one of the most celebrated Orthodox Christian icons. It is said to be one of the icons written by St. Luke the Evangelist. According to tradition, in the 5th century, the icon was  transferred from Jerusalem to Constantinople, where a church was built specially for it. These are the same traditions as accrue to the Hodegetria icon, suggesting the stories have become conflated; in terms of composition the Tikhvin icon is of the Hodegetria type. Some art historians prefer a date of about 1300, and a Russian artist. This matches a further tradition that the icon miraculously appeared, hovering over a lake, in Russia near Tikhvin in 1383.

Since the 14th century, the icon was held in Tikhvin, where eventually Tikhvin Assumption Monastery was founded to host the icon. In 1941, during World War II, for a month Tikhvin was occupied by German troops, who looted the monastery and, in particular, took the icon to Pskov, and in 1944 transferred it to Riga. The icon eventually was taken out of Russia for safety by a Russian Orthodox bishop from Kolka parish and later Bishop of Riga - John (Garklāvs) of Chicago. In the period between 1949 and 2004 the icon remained at Holy Trinity Orthodox Cathedral in Chicago, IL United States. It was returned to Tikhvin, Russia in 2004 by his adopted son, Fr. Sergei Garklavs of Chicago. In turn, the Bishop Mstislav of Tikhvin gifted an exact reproduction of the Tikhvin Icon, complete with a bejeweled riza, in 2016. The icon is kept at the Tikhvin Assumption Monastery, where it was kept prior to 1917. Most of the icon, except the exposed skin of Jesus and Mary (the two faces and necks, both sets of hands, and the feet of Jesus), is normally covered by a chased frame of precious metals and jewels (riza).

References

External links
Theotokos of Tikhvin in OrthodoxWiki

Tikhvin
Paintings of the Madonna and Child
Russian icons

ja:チフヴィンの生神女